

465001–465100 

|-bgcolor=#f2f2f2
| colspan=4 align=center | 
|}

465101–465200 

|-bgcolor=#f2f2f2
| colspan=4 align=center | 
|}

465201–465300 

|-bgcolor=#f2f2f2
| colspan=4 align=center | 
|}

465301–465400 

|-bgcolor=#f2f2f2
| colspan=4 align=center | 
|}

465401–465500 

|-bgcolor=#f2f2f2
| colspan=4 align=center | 
|}

465501–465600 

|-id=513
| 465513 Chenchen ||  || Chen Chen (born 1948) is one of the most famous movie stars in Taiwan. Her acting career started in 1963. Over the years she has acted in more than ninety films. She was awarded Best Actress twice in Asia Film Festival. She received the Golden Horse Life-Achievement Award in 2013. || 
|}

465601–465700 

|-bgcolor=#f2f2f2
| colspan=4 align=center | 
|}

465701–465800 

|-bgcolor=#f2f2f2
| colspan=4 align=center | 
|}

465801–465900 

|-bgcolor=#f2f2f2
| colspan=4 align=center | 
|}

465901–466000 

|-bgcolor=#f2f2f2
| colspan=4 align=center | 
|}

References 

465001-466000